Julian Richard Smith  (born 30 August 1971) is a British politician who served as Government Chief Whip from 2017 to 2019 and Secretary of State for Northern Ireland from 2019 to 2020. A member of the Conservative Party, he has been the Member of Parliament (MP) for Skipton and Ripon since 2010.

He was the Vice-Chamberlain of the Household from 2016 to 2017 and Government Deputy Chief Whip in 2017. He served in Prime Minister Theresa May’s Cabinet as Chief Whip of the House of Commons from November 2017 to July 2019.

He served in Prime Minister Boris Johnson’s Cabinet as Northern Ireland Secretary from 2019 to 2020. He successfully negotiated the New Decade, New Approach agreement with Tánaiste Simon Coveney which restored the power-sharing government of the Northern Ireland Executive after three years without devolution at Stormont.

Early life
Smith was born in the city of Stirling in Scotland on 30 August 1971. He was educated at Balfron High School, a comprehensive school to the west of Stirling, followed by a sixth-form bursary to Millfield School, an independent school in South West England, and the University of Birmingham, where he read English and History.

Parliamentary career

Smith was elected as MP for Skipton and Ripon in 2010 with a majority of 9,950. In Parliament, he served on the Scottish Affairs Committee for a brief period in 2010 and was Parliamentary Private Secretary to Sir Alan Duncan MP, Minister of State for International Development, from September 2010 to 2012. Smith was subsequently Parliamentary Private Secretary to Justine Greening MP, Secretary of State for International Development, from 2012 to May 2015. After the 2015 General Election, Smith was appointed an Assistant Government Whip in David Cameron's Second Ministry.

He was returned to the House of Commons in 2015 with an increased majority of 20,761. Following the European Union membership referendum on 23 June and David Cameron's resignation as Prime Minister, Smith was one of six MPs who led the leadership campaign on behalf of the Home Secretary, Theresa May. After May became Prime Minister on 13 July 2016, four days later Smith was appointed Vice-Chamberlain of the Household, a senior position within the Government Whips' Office.  He served as Deputy Chief Whip to Gavin Williamson from June 2017 to November 2017 and then, on 2 November 2017, he was appointed Chief Whip of the House of Commons.

Smith was strongly critical of Theresa May's cabinet's behaviour after the 2017 election, saying the government should have made clear that it would "inevitably" have to accept a softer Brexit. He accused ministers of trying to destabilise and undermine May.

After ceasing to be Secretary of State for Northern Ireland Smith accepted paid appointments advising companies that did business there.

In February 2022 Smith called on Prime Minister Boris Johnson to withdraw insinuations that Opposition Leader Keir Starmer had culpably failed to prosecute notorious sex offender Jimmy Savile in his previous role as Director of Public Prosecutions.

Secretary of State for Northern Ireland

Smith was made Secretary of State for Northern Ireland when Boris Johnson assumed the role of Prime Minister. Under his tenure devolved power-sharing was restored in January 2020. Smith was sacked as Northern Ireland Secretary in Johnson's post-Brexit reshuffle. He had lasted 204 days in the role.

The decision to dismiss Smith as Northern Ireland Secretary was criticised by a number of prominent political figures in Northern Ireland, including SDLP leader Colum Eastwood who described the move as showing "dangerous indifference" by the Prime Minister. Smith had been widely seen as instrumental in securing a cross-party deal to restore the Northern Ireland Executive, after three years without a devolved government in Stormont. Tributes to Smith's tenure as Northern Ireland Secretary were paid by NI First Minister Arlene Foster and Taoiseach Leo Varadkar. Both praised him for his role in ending the political deadlock.

Some political commentators expressed their surprise at Smith's dismissal, given his perceived success during his time as Secretary of State for Northern Ireland. It was suggested that Smith's testimony to the Northern Ireland Affairs Select Committee in October 2019, in which he described a potential no-deal Brexit as being "a very, very bad idea for Northern Ireland", had influenced the decision to remove him from his position. Stephen Bush, political editor of the New Statesman, speculated that the consequence of Johnson's removal of Smith would be the destabilisation of the new power-sharing agreement and increased difficulty in negotiating the details of the "New Protocol".

Security 
In October 2013, The Guardian alleged that Smith may have breached national security by posting an image on his website of himself alongside military personnel. Smith had previously asked questions in Parliament about whether The Guardians handling of intelligence material leaked by Edward Snowden had breached national security. He reported the newspaper to the police. Smith argued the newspaper should be investigated as it had "endangered" British security personnel by publishing leaked information.

Pairing allegations 
On 19 July 2018, Smith was reported to be resisting calls to resign his position as Government Chief Whip, following allegations that he had instructed five Conservative MPs to break pairing agreements in an important parliamentary vote the previous day. Only one MP, Conservative party chairman Brandon Lewis, complied with the instruction. Subsequent reports indicated that Smith had given similar instructions to four other MPs, but Lewis had been the only one willing to break what one commentator described later as "a centuries old 'code of honour'". Before it became known that the affair had involved approaches by Smith to more than one MP, Prime Minister Theresa May backed Lewis, stating that "The breaking of the pair was done in error. It wasn't good enough and will not be repeated."

References

External links

Official website

|-

|-

|-

|-

1971 births
Living people
People educated at Millfield
Alumni of the University of Birmingham
Conservative Party (UK) MPs for English constituencies
Members of the Privy Council of the United Kingdom
Secretaries of State for Northern Ireland
UK MPs 2010–2015
UK MPs 2015–2017
UK MPs 2017–2019
UK MPs 2019–present
Commanders of the Order of the British Empire
People from Stirling
Free Enterprise Group